The 1961–62 Iraq Central FA First Division Cup was the 14th season of the Iraq Central FA League (the top division of football in Baghdad and its neighbouring cities from 1948 to 1973). It kicked off on 24 October 1961 and ended on 27 April 1962.

The tournament started with the participation of eight teams, but Montakhab Al-Shorta withdrew after playing two matches when the Iraq Central Football Association (IFA) enforced a rule preventing players from playing for institute-representative teams when they do not also work for the same institution. Furthermore, Amanat Al-Asima were disqualified for a breach of the rules, leaving just six teams remaining.

Unlike the previous five seasons, the IFA decided to hold the tournament in a round-robin format, meaning each team played each other team in the league once. The winners of the league were Al-Quwa Al-Jawiya, who won their second title. They then went on to win the 1962 Iraq Central FA Altruism Cup by beating Al-Kuliya Al-Askariya 4–2. Four players shared the top scorer award, each scoring four goals.

League table

Results

Top goalscorers

References

External links
 Iraqi Football Website

Iraq Central FA League seasons
Iraq
1961 in Iraqi sport
1962 in Iraqi sport